Inmarsat-6 F1 is a communications satellite to be operated by the British satellite operator Inmarsat and designed and manufactured by Airbus Defence and Space on the Eurostar 3000EOR satellite bus. Part of the Inmarsat-6 satellite fleet, it will be Inmarsat's first dual-payload satellite, with capabilities in both L-band (ELERA) and Ka-band (Global Xpress). Claimed to be the largest and most sophisticated commercial telecommunications satellite ever launched, as the first of two such vehicles, it was placed into supersynchronous transfer orbit on 22 December 2021.

The platform uses electric propulsion for orbit raising in order to reduce the mass compared to traditional systems. The I-6 satellites will be powered by Safran/Snecma PPS-5000 electric propulsion will then raise the satellite into final geosynchronous orbit and will include two deployable solar arrays and batteries. The design life of the I-6F1 will be 15 years.

The L-band payload supports a wide variety of purposes including very low cost mobile services and IoT applications, while the Ka-band payload augments the Global Xpress constellation.

See also 

 Inmarsat

References

External links 

Communications satellites in geostationary orbit
Satellites using the Eurostar bus
Inmarsat satellites
Spacecraft launched in 2021